I Lived With You is a 1933 British romantic comedy film directed by Maurice Elvey and starring Ivor Novello, Ursula Jeans and Ida Lupino. It is based on the West End hit play I Lived With You by Novello.

Plot
Young Cockney shop girl Gladys Wallis meets penniless Russian Prince Felix Lenieff in the Hampton Court Maze and, learning he has no place to stay, takes him home to live with her family. His presence creates chaos in her family's humble Fulham home.  At first the others do not believe he is a prince, but he has a locket that Nicholas II, the last tsar, gave to his now-deceased mother. Gladys's father works in the diamond trade and confirms that the jewels on it are valuable diamonds. Felix does not want to sell them for his own sake, but is persuaded by Mr. Wallis to let him do so, as it will benefit the family.

Cast
 Ivor Novello as Prince Felix Lenieff
 Ursula Jeans as Gladys Wallis
 Ida Lupino as Ada Wallis
 Minnie Rayner as Mrs. Wallis
 Eliot Makeham as Mr. Wallis
 Cicely Oates as Flossie Williams
 Jack Hawkins as Mort [Gladys's boyfriend]
 Beryl Harrison as Miss Violet Bradshaw
 Douglas Beaumont as Albert Wallis [Gladys's brother]
 Molly Fisher as May Sawley (as Mollie Fisher)
 Victor Bogetti as Thornton [Ada's boyfriend]
 Davina Craig as Maggie
 Hannah Jones
 Agnes Imlay
 Maud Buchanan
 Gwen Floyd

Critical reception
TV Guide wrote, "originally a play by Novello, who transplanted almost the entire cast for the filmed version, the main exception to the stage cast being Lupino, who gave a strong emotional performance." and the Radio Times wrote, "it's all directed with a teasingly respectable salaciousness by Maurice Elvey, but of much greater interest to most film fans will be the pre-fame performances of Jack Hawkins and Ida Lupino." and BBC Wales Arts wrote, "this is a riotously funny film and Novello not for the first or last time on screen, operates, tantalisingly, on different layers. He's always aware of his screen spectator in the dark, but don't be misled - this performance doesn't reek of the greasepaint in the least. It's just that Novello has the rare ability to maintain a playful, ironic stance which many critics, even today, seem incapable of appreciating or recognising."

References

Bibliography
 Low, Rachael. Filmmaking in 1930s Britain. George Allen & Unwin, 1985.
 Wood, Linda. British Films, 1927-1939. British Film Institute, 1986.

External links

1933 films
1933 romantic comedy films
1930s English-language films
Films directed by Maurice Elvey
Films shot at Twickenham Film Studios
Films set in London
British films based on plays
British romantic comedy films
British black-and-white films
1930s British films